Qeshlaq-e Seyyedlar or Qeshlaq-e Seyyedlar may refer to various places in Iran:
Qeshlaq-e Seyyedlar Dadalu Hoseyn Ali
Qeshlaq-e Seyyedlar Dadalu Yidallah
Qeshlaq-e Seyyedlar Rahab Yisi Zadeh
Qeshlaq-e Seyyedlar Sari Quyi Hajj Bayram
Qeshlaq-e Seyyedlar-e Seyfollah
Qeshlaq-e Seyyedlari Sari Quyi Moradlu